Rawle Clarke (born 17 September 1952) is a Barbadian sprinter. He competed in the men's 200 metres at the 1976 Summer Olympics.

References

1952 births
Living people
Athletes (track and field) at the 1976 Summer Olympics
Athletes (track and field) at the 1978 Commonwealth Games
Athletes (track and field) at the 1979 Pan American Games
Barbadian male sprinters
Olympic athletes of Barbados
Commonwealth Games competitors for Barbados
Pan American Games competitors for Barbados
Place of birth missing (living people)